Goodwater or Good Water may refer to:

Goodwater, Alabama
Good Water, Missouri
Goodwater, Saskatchewan
Goodwater Creek, a stream in Missouri